Jakarta is a Serbian and Yugoslav rock band formed in Belgrade in 1981.

The band was formed by vocalist Igor Popović and guitarist Jane Parđovski, and initially went through numerous lineup changes, before a steady lineup was formed, consisting of Popović, Parđovski, Rade Bulatović (bass guitar), Miloš Petrović (keyboards) and Ivan Fece (drums). Jakarta released their debut, synth-funk-oriented album Maske za dvoje in 1984 to warm reception by Yugoslav audience and critics. The band's second album, pop rock-oriented Bomba u grudima, released in 1986, failed to reach the success of the band's debut, and the band split up two years after its release. In 2014, following the release of a best of compilation, Popović reformed Jakarta, the band releasing the comeback album Letim in 2020.

Band history

1981–1988
Jakarta was formed in Belgrade in 1981. During the initial period, the band went through numerous lineup changes, before original members Igor Popović (vocals) and Jane Parđovski (a former member of the band Butik, guitar) started performing with Rade Bulatović (bass guitar), Miloš Petrović (keyboards) and Ivan Fece (drums). Fece was previously a member of the band Luna, and Petrović was a graduated from the Belgrade Faculty of Music and simultaneously played with the jazz band Jazzy. The band gained the attention of the public performing as the opening act for U Škripcu, and was soon offered a contract by PGP-RTB record label.

They released their debut, synth-funk-oriented album Maske za dvoje (Masks for Two) in 1984. The album was produced by Saša Habić and featured Paul Pignon (saxophone), Kire Mitrev (trombone), Goce Dimitrovski (trumpet) and Ivan Švager (tenor saxophone) as guests. The album saw success with the music critics and the audience, bringing the hits "Spiritus", "Piromanija" ("Pyromania"), "Dama sa severa" ("Lady from the North") and "Pozovi me" ("Call Me"). The song "Nebo je još plavo zbog tebe" ("The Sky Is Still Blue because of You") was originally intended to be a duet of Popović and Massimo Savić of the band Dorian Gray; however, the song ended up with Popović on vocals only, as Savić had an exclusive contract with Jugoton. In 1985, Popović appeared as vocalist in the Rex Ilusivii song "Arabia", released on the compilation album Ventilator 202 Demo Top 10 Vol. 3, and took a part in the YU Rock Misija project, a Yugoslav contribution to Live Aid. On 15 June 1985, Jakarta, alongside 23 other acts, performed at the corresponding charity concert at the Red Star Stadium in Belgrade.

The band's second album, Bomba u grudima (Bomb in the Chest), recorded with the new drummer Miroslav Karlović and produced by Habić, was released in 1986. With Bomba u grudima Jakarta moved towards pop rock sound. Despite "Reci gde je lova" ("Tell Us Where's the Money"), "Mali policajci" ("Little Policemen") and the title track receiving some airplay, the album was not well-received by the critics and Jakarta quietly retired from the scene.

Post breakup
After Jakarta disbanded, Igor Popović moved to Italy, where he, for a period of time, owned a fashion company. Petrović gained a magister degree from the Belgrade Faculty of Music and started a successful career in classical music and jazz. He died in Belgrade in 2010. Rade Bulatović dedicated himself to jazz, performing with a number of Serbian jazz musicians. Parđovski retired from music. On 3 June 2011 he died in a railway accident.

2014–present
In December 2013, the compilation album entitled San je jak (The Dream Is Strong) was released. The compilation featured 12 songs recorded between 1982 and 1986. Following the release of the compilation, in January 2014, Popović announced the new Jakarta album. In November 2020, Jakarta released the comeback album Letim (I'm Flying). Letim featured Popović on vocals, Jane Parđovski's son Vuk Parđovski on guitar, Dejan Grujić on guitar and 12-string guitar, Goran Antović on keyboards, Darko Grujić on keyboards and Dadiša Aksentijević on drums; brothers Dejan (of Orthodox Celts and formerly of Čutua & Oblaci and Ruž) and Darko Grujić (of Point Blank and Nikola Čuturilo's backing band and formerly of Sirova Koža) were, at the beginning of the 1980s, members of one of Jakarta's early lineups. The album, announced by the singles "Selo Banja" ("Village Banja", a cover of Peter Gabriel's song "Solsbury Hill" with Serbian language lyrics written by writer Goran Skrobonja) and "Tamna strana meseca" ("The Dark Side of the Moon"), features Popović's new songs, as well as covers of songs by Peter Gabriel, Fleetwood Mac and Simple Minds. The album was produced by Saša Habić.

Legacy
In 2012, the song "Spiritus" was covered by Serbian heavy metal band Trigger on their cover album EX. In 2013, the same song was covered by Serbian DJ SevdahBABY and singer Djixx, their version entitled "Ti mi se tako sviđaš" ("I Like You so Much", after the song chorus), as a single.

In 2011, the song "Pozovi me" was polled, by the listeners of Radio 202, one of 60 greatest songs released by PGP-RTB/PGP-RTS during the label's history.

Discography

Studio albums
Maske za dvoje (1984)
Bomba u grudima (1986)
 Letim (2020)

Compilation albums
San je jak (2013)

Singles
"Amerika" / "Put u bajano" (1983)
"Spiritus" / "Problem" (1984)
"Osvojiću svet" / "Osvojiću svet – Instrumental" (1985)

References

External links 
Jakarta at Discogs

Serbian rock music groups
Serbian art rock groups
Serbian pop rock music groups
Serbian power pop groups
Yugoslav rock music groups
Yugoslav art rock groups
Funk rock musical groups
Art pop groups
Musical groups from Belgrade
Musical groups established in 1981
Musical groups disestablished in 1986